Wesley Girls High School is a high school located in Secunderabad, Telangana, India.

See also
Education in India
Wesley Degree College, Secunderabad
List of schools in India
List of institutions of higher education in Telangana

References

External links 

High schools and secondary schools in Telangana
Girls' schools in Telangana
Schools in Secunderabad
Educational institutions in India with year of establishment missing